The Lipovans or Lippovans are ethnic Russian Old Believers living in Romania, Ukraine, Moldova and Bulgaria who settled in the Principality of Moldavia, in the east of the Principality of Wallachia (Muntenia), and in the regions of Dobruja and Budjak during the 17th and 18th centuries. According to the 2011 Romanian census, there are a total of 23,487 Lipovans in Romania, mostly living in Northern Dobruja, in the Tulcea County but also in the Constanța County, and in the cities of Iași, Brăila and Bucharest. In Bulgaria, they inhabit two villages: Kazashko and Tataritsa.

Name 
The origin of the name of the Lipovans is not known exactly, but it may come from the linden trees ("Lipa" or "Липа" in Russian) of the area they populate bordering the Wild Fields. Linguist  considers this to be folk etymology. Another hypothesis claims the name derives from the name "Filipp" (1672-1742) which is alleged to have been the true name of the son of Nikita Pustosvyat (d.1683) who according to a legend led the group of dissenters who emigrated to what is now Romania, his adepts being named Filippovtsy which became Lipovtsi and finally Lipovane. Another hypothesis derives it from "Filippovka", a holiday name dedicated to Saint Philip of Moscow.

History 

The Lipovans emigrated from Russia in the 18th century, as dissenters from the main Russian Orthodox Church. They settled along the Prut River in Moldavia and in the Danube Delta. They have maintained strong religious traditions which predate the reforms of the Russian Orthodox Church undertaken during the rule of Patriarch Nikon. When the Patriarch made changes to worship in 1652, some believers carried on worshipping in the "old way". In that sense, they continued to speak Old Russian, to cross themselves with two fingers instead of three, and to keep their beards. The Russian government and the Orthodox Church persecuted them, and as a result various sects arose whose goal was to commit suicide, e.g., by burning themselves (self-burners: сожигатели, sozhigateli), with many others being forced to emigrate.

In 1876, the Lipovans were joined by members of the Skoptsy sect, who also emigrated to Romania to escape persecution.

Lipovans were considered to be schismatic by the Russian Orthodox Church, although relations have improved recently. (See main article on Old Believers.)

Population 
The main centre of the Lipovan community in Ukraine is the town of Vylkove, which has its own church, St Nicholas. In order to construct their homes, the Lipovans create islets of dry land by digging mud out from trenches and making a series of canals. The house walls are made of reed and mud, and thatching is standard for the roofing. For details on the Lipovans in Bulgaria, see Russians in Bulgaria.

See also 
 Community of the Lipovan Russians in Romania
 Lipovan Orthodox Old-Rite Church

References

External links 
 Second-Hand Souls: Selected Writing by Nichita Danilov (translated from Romanian by Sean Cotter)
 Lipovan's icons: The Bleschunov Municipal Museum of Personal Collections
 Romania. Religious Freedom Report 1999
 Zorile newspaper published in Romanian and Russian

Old Believers
Ethnoreligious groups
Russian sub-ethnic groups
Slavic ethnic groups
Ethnic groups in Romania
Ethnic groups in Bulgaria
Ethnic groups in Ukraine